The Treaty of Nerchinsk of 1689 was the first treaty between the Tsardom of Russia and the Qing dynasty of China. The Russians gave up the area north of the Amur River as far as the Stanovoy Range and kept the area between the Argun River and Lake Baikal. This border along the Argun River and Stanovoy Range lasted until the Amur Annexation via the Treaty of Aigun in 1858 and the Convention of Peking in 1860. It opened markets for Russian goods in China, and gave Russians access to Chinese supplies and luxuries.

The agreement was signed in Nerchinsk on August 27, 1689. The signatories were Songgotu on behalf of the Kangxi Emperor and Fyodor Golovin on behalf of the Russian tsars Peter I and Ivan V.

The authoritative version was in Latin, with translations into Russian and Manchu, but these versions differed considerably. There was no official Chinese text for another two centuries, but the border markers were inscribed in Chinese along with Manchu, Russian and Latin.

Later, in 1727, the Treaty of Kiakhta fixed what is now the border of Mongolia west of the Argun and opened up the caravan trade. In 1858 (Treaty of Aigun) Russia annexed the land north of the Amur and in 1860 (Treaty of Beijing) took the coast down to Vladivostok. The current border runs along the Argun, Amur and Ussuri rivers.

Names
Treaty of Nerchinsk is written in other languages as follows: 

 (transliteration: Nerčinskij dogovor)
Manchu: , (Möllendorff transliteration: nibcoo-i bade bithe)

History

From about 1640, Russians entered the Amur basin from the north, into land claimed by the Qing dynasty which at this time were just beginning their conquest of the Ming dynasty. The Qing had, by the 1680s, completed the conquest of China proper and eliminated the last Ming successor states in the south. With the Qing dynasty now firmly in control of China, it was in a position to deal with what they saw as Russian encroachment in Manchuria, the ancient homeland of the ruling Aisin Gioro clan. By 1685 most of the Russians had been driven out of the area. See Sino–Russian border conflicts for details.

After their first victory at Albazin in 1685, the Qing government sent two letters to the Tsar (in Latin) suggesting peace and demanding that Russian freebooters leave the Amur. The Russian government, knowing that the Amur could not be defended and being more concerned with events in the west, sent Fyodor Golovin east as plenipotentiary.  Golovin left Moscow in January 1686 with 500 streltsy and reached Selenginsk near Lake Baikal in October 1687, from whence he sent couriers ahead. It was agreed the meeting would be in Selenginsk in 1688. At this point the  Oirats (western Mongols) under Galdan attacked the eastern Mongols in the area between Selenginsk and Peking and negotiations had to be delayed. To avoid the fighting Golovin moved east to Nerchinsk where it was agreed that talks would take place. Qing troops with a size of 3,000 to 15,000 soldiers under the command of Songgotu left Peking on June 1689 and arrived in July. Talks went on from August 22 to September 6.

The language used was Latin, the translators being, for the Russians, a Pole named Andrei Bielobocki and for the Chinese the Jesuits Jean-Francois Gerbillon and Thomas Pereira. To avoid problems of precedence, tents were erected side by side so that neither side would be seen as visiting the other. Russian acceptance of the treaty required a relaxation of what had been, in Ming times, an iron rule of Chinese diplomacy, requiring the non-Chinese party to accept language which characterized the foreigner as an inferior or tributary. The conspicuous absence of such linguistic gamesmanship from the Treaty of Nerchinsk, together with the equally conspicuous absence of Chinese language or personnel, suggests that the Kangxi Emperor was using the Manchu language as a deliberate end-run around his more conservative Han bureaucracy. The Yuan dynasty's rule of Mongol tribes living around Lake Baikal was claimed by the Qing, who incited the defection of the Nerchinsk Onggut and Buryat Mongols away from the Russians.

The Qing dynasty wished to remove the Russians from the Amur. They were interested in the Amur since it was the northern border of the original Manchu heartland. They could ignore the area west of the Argun since it was then controlled by the Oirats. The Kangxi Emperor of China also wished to settle with Russia in order to free his hands to deal with the Dzungar Mongols of Central Asia, to his northwest. The Qing dynasty also wanted a delineated frontier to keep nomads and outlaws from fleeing across the border.

The Russians, for their part, knew that the Amur was indefensible and were more interested in establishing profitable trade, which the Kangxi Emperor had threatened to block unless the border dispute were resolved. Golovin accepted the loss of the Amur in exchange for possession of Trans-Baikalia and access to Chinese markets for Russian traders. The Russians were also concerned with the military strength of the Qing dynasty, who had demonstrated their capability, in 1685 and 1686, by twice overrunning the Russian outpost at Albazin.

At this time, Russia could not send large forces to the Far East, as they were launching a war with the Ottoman Empire. At the same time, the Dzungars captured Mongolia, threatening the Qing dynasty, so Russia and Qing dynasty were inclined to sign a peace treaty as soon as possible.

The border
The agreed boundary was the Argun River north to its confluence with the Shilka River, up the Shilka to the "Gorbitsa River", up the Gorbitsa to its headwaters, then along the east-west watershed through the Stanovoy Mountains and down the Uda River (Khabarovsk Krai) to the Sea of Okhotsk at its southwest corner.

The border west of the Argun was not defined (at the time, this area was controlled by the Oirats). Neither side had very exact knowledge of the course of the Uda River. The Gorbitsa is hard to find on modern maps.

Treaty details

The treaty had six paragraphs: 1 and 2: definition of the border, 3. Albazin to be abandoned and destroyed. 4. Refugees who arrived before the treaty to stay, those arriving after the treaty to be sent back. 5. Trade to be allowed with proper documents. 6. Boundary stones to be erected, and general exhortations to avoid conflict.

Economic aspects
The treaty was "a triumph of intercultural negotiation" that gave Russians access to Chinese markets for expensive furs; Russians purchased porcelain, silk, gold, silver, and tea as well as with provisions for the northern garrisons.  The cross-border trade created a multiethnic character to Nerchinsk and Kyakhta in Siberia. They became locales for the interaction of Russian, Central Asian, and Chinese cultures. The trade extended European economic expansion deep into Asia. Profitable trade fell off in the 1720s because the policies of Peter I limited private initiative and ended Siberia's role as a major economic link between the West and East.

Later developments
Russian interest in the Amur River was revived in the 1750s. In 1757 Fedor Ivanovich Soimonov was sent to map the area. He mapped the Shilka, which was partly in Chinese territory, but was turned back when he reached its confluence with the Argun. In 1757 Vasili Fedorovich Bradishchev was sent to Peking to investigate the possibility of using the Amur. He was received cordially and given a definite no.  After that the matter was dropped.

In 1799, when Adam Johann von Krusenstern visited Canton he saw an English ship that had brought furs from Russian America in five months as opposed to the two years or more for the Okhotsk–Yakutsk–Kyakhta route. He saw that this could replace the overland trade. He submitted a memoir to the Naval Ministry which led to his command of the first Russian circumnavigation. He was able to sell American furs at Canton after some official resistance. Only when he returned to Kronstadt did he learn that his presence in Canton had provoked an edict making clear that Russian trade with the Middle Kingdom would be confined to Kyakhta.

For the rest see Treaty of Kyakhta and Amur Annexation.

See also
 Foreign relations of imperial China
 History of Sino-Russian relations

Notes

References
 Bao, Muping. "trade centres (maimaicheng) in Mongolia, and their function in Sino–Russian trade networks." International Journal of Asian Studies 3.2 (2006): 211-237.
 Chen, Vincent. Sino Russian Relations in the Seventeenth Century. (Martinus Nijhoff, 1966).
 Frank, V.S. "The Territorial Terms of the Sino-Russian Treaty of Nerchinsk, 1689". Pacific Historical Review 16#3 (Aug., 1947), pp. 265-270 online
 Gardener, William. "China and Russia: The Beginnings of Contact" History Today, 27 (January 1977): 22-30. 
 Maier, Lothar. "Gerhard Friedrich Müller's memoranda on Russian relations with China and the reconquest of the Amur." Slavonic and East European Review (1981): 219-240. online
 Mancall, Mark. Russia and China: Their Diplomatic Relations to 1728. Harvard University Press, 1971.

Perdue, Peter C. China Marches West: The Qing Conquest of Central Eurasia. Belknap Press of Harvard University Press, 2005.
 Perdue, Peter C. "Boundaries and trade in the early modern world: Negotiations at Nerchinsk and Beijing." Eighteenth-Century Studies (2010): 341-356. online
 Perdue, Peter C. "Nature and Power: China and the Wider World." Social Science History 37.3 (2013): 373-391.
 Perdue, Peter C. "Military Mobilization in Seventeenth and Eighteenth-Century China, Russia, and Mongolia." Modern Asian Studies 30.4 (1996): 757-793. online
 Stolberg, Eva-Maria.  "Interracial Outposts in Siberia: Nerchinsk, Kiakhta, and the Russo-Chinese Trade in the Seventeenth/Eighteenth Centuries." Journal of Early Modern History 4#3-4 (2000): 322-336.

External links
The Russian-Chinese Border: Today’s Reality

History of Manchuria
1689 in China
1689 in Russia
1689 treaties
China–Russia treaties
Nerchinsk
Nerchinsk
Latin prose texts